Events in the year 1923 in Belgium.

Incumbents
Monarch – Albert I
Prime Minister – Georges Theunis

Events

 23 May – Sabena is founded at Brussels Airport
 23 September – 12th Gordon Bennett Cup held in Brussels

Publications
Periodicals
 Annales de la Société d'archéologie de Bruxelles, vol. 31.
 Annales de la Société d'émulation de Bruges: revue trimestrielle pour l'étude de l'histoire et des antiquités de la Flandre, vol. 66.

Books
 Jean Haust, Étymologies wallonnes et françaises (Liège and Paris, H. Vaillant-Carmanne and Édouard Champion)
 Maurits Sabbe, Christopher Plantin, translated by Alice Van Riel-Göransson (Antwerp, J.-E. Buschmann)
 Camille Tihon, La Principauté et le Diocèse de Liège sous Robert de Bergues, 1557-1564 (Université de Liège)

Art and architecture

Buildings
 Eagle, Star & British Dominions Insurance Company office building ("British Dominions House") in Antwerp
 Work starts on Victor Horta's Palace of Fine Arts in Brussels (completed 1929)

Paintings
 Gustave De Smet, De mosseleters (Royal Museum of Fine Arts Antwerp)

Births
 2 April – Georges Octors, conductor (died 2020)

Deaths
 12 August – Victor Harou, explorer  (born 1851)
 1 December – Virginie Loveling, Flemish poet and novelist (born 1836)

References

 
1920s in Belgium
Belgium
Years of the 20th century in Belgium
Belgium